The Wilder Brigade Monument (also known as the Wilder Tower) is a large public monument located at the Chickamauga and Chattanooga National Military Park in Walker County, Georgia, United States. The monument, which consists of a stone watchtower, was erected to honor the Lightning Brigade (led by John T. Wilder) of the Union Army's Army of the Cumberland. The brigade participated in the Battle of Chickamauga during the American Civil War, with the monument located on the battlefield where the brigade fought.

History

Background 
In mid-1863, during the American Civil War, the Army of the Cumberland (Union Army) was conducting a military campaign targeting the city of Chattanooga, Tennessee. By September of that year, the Army of Tennessee (Confederate States Army) had withdrawn from Tennessee and into north Georgia, near Lafayette, Georgia. Starting on September 18, the two armies fought in the Battle of Chickamauga, which lasted until September 20 and was one of the bloodiest battles in the war, with approximately 35,000 soldiers killed, wounded, captured, or missing. During the battle, Union officer John T. Wilder led his brigade (known as the Lightning Brigade) into action.

Construction and dedication 
Several years later, in August 1890, several former officers from the brigade met to discuss a brigade reunion. At that time, the idea of a monument honoring the brigade at the Chickamauga battlefield was brought up. Wilder approved of the idea and promised to match whatever funds were raised by the brigade, with the plan to have each regiment contribute $1,000 and the battery contribute $500. The monument would be the first one erected on the battlefield. In August 1891, a monument organization was created at the reunion, and fundraising commenced. Fundraising was initially successful, and in early 1892, construction of the monument began. However, by 1893, fundraising had slowed, and the financial situation was worsened by a bank failure at a Tennessee bank holding $1,200 for the organization. As a result, work stopped, with the monument only partially constructed. In 1895, another reunion held at the battlefield led to additional money being raised, but not enough to restart construction. In 1897, Indianapolis businessman Arthur McKain donated $1,200 to Wilder to help fund the monument, and construction resumed shortly afterward. While initial monument designs were drawn up by Harry Hargraves, they had undergone significant revisions, and by the time construction restarted, E. E. Betts had modified the design. By 1898, Wilder stated that the monument would be dedicated the following year.

The monument was formally dedicated on September 20, 1899. Many local citizens and Civil War veterans, including many members of the Lightning Brigade, were present at the ceremony. James A. Connolly gave an opening address for the ceremony, which was followed by Wilder turning the monument over to general Henry V. Boynton. Boynton accepted on behalf of the Chickamauga and Chattanooga National Military Park. Additional speeches were then given by Union Army captain William Rule and Confederate States Army colonel Tomlinson Fort. A brief tribute to the brigade was read aloud before additional addresses were given by general Smith D. Atkins, Indiana Governor James A. Mount, and Frank E. Benjamin.

Construction was later completed in 1903. In 1914, the tower was damaged by a lightning strike and was later repaired.

Design 
The monument consists of a watch tower made from limestone quarried from near the battlefield. Small rectangular windows are present around the tower on each side. It is located on the southern end of the battlefield.

See also 
 List of Union Civil War monuments and memorials

References

Bibliography

External links 

 
 

1903 establishments in Georgia (U.S. state)
Buildings and structures in Walker County, Georgia
Chickamauga and Chattanooga National Military Park
Limestone buildings in the United States
Limestone sculptures in the United States
Outdoor sculptures in Georgia (U.S. state)
Tourist attractions in Walker County, Georgia
Towers completed in 1903
Union (American Civil War) monuments and memorials in Georgia (U.S. state)